The United States Army Transport Service (ATS) was established as a sea-going transport service that was independent of the Navy Department. ATS operated army transport ships for both troop transport and cargo service between United States ports and overseas posts. This service is often confused with the Army Transportation Service, created in France in 1917 to manage American Expeditionary Forces transport. ATS was a branch of the Quartermaster Corps responsible for land and water transport, becoming a separate United States Army Transportation Corps on July 31, 1942.

History

Civil War

During the American Civil War the United States Department of War expanded. It handled the recruiting, training, supply, medical care, transportation and pay of two million soldiers, comprising both the regular army and the much larger temporary volunteer army. The war department established a sea-going transport service of its own, independent of the Navy Department. ATS was maintained as a branch of the Quartermasters' Department. A fleet of steamboats and pilot-boats were used in the military campaigns in the Eastern Carolinas. This was the origin of the United States Army Transport Service. Many battles were won because of the Army Admiral's ability to swiftly and effectively move troops and supplies. At this time the United States Army was small and generally assigned to defend the nation's frontiers from attacks by Indians. The Union Army was part of the U.S. Department of War and was the army that fought for the Union during the American Civil War.

A large number of ships were bought or chartered by the U. S. Government for transport service. The steamer CSS Fanny was armed as a gunboat and operated by the Quartermaster Department of the Union Army during the American Civil War. The SS Fulton and SS Arago were chartered by the Union Army in the Army Transport Service, for use as a troop transport and in operation with the South Atlantic Blockading Squadron throughout the war. ATS operated between New York, Port Royal, South Carolina and New Orleans, Louisiana. At the close of the war, the fleet of 590 ocean transports in service on July 1, 1865, was reduced to 53 vessels by June 30, 1866. Most of them were discharged soon after.

Spanish–American War

After the Civil War, the ATS disappeared after the signing of peace at Appomattox, but was reestablished during the Spanish–American War when the Army's difficulty in transporting its forces to Cuba was exposed in the Spanish–American War with formal establishment in the fall of 1898 to operate under the Quartermaster Corps of the Army. Forces were recruited, not from the Navy, but from the Merchant Marine.

The USAT Sherman, was bought by United States Government in 1898 and converted to United States Army transport for use in Spanish-American War, and later employed as troop transport to Philippines.

ATS operated the Army's large ships but did not operate smaller vessels of the harbor boat service (tugs, launches, small and short range supply boats), the mine planters of the Coast Artillery Corps or any vessels of the Corps of Engineers.

World War I

During World War I, ATS operated Army transport ships for both troop transport and cargo service between United States ports and overseas posts. The USAT McClellan was a United States Army transport ship that saw service during the Spanish–American War and World War I. Except during World War I, when the Army's large transports were turned over to the Naval Overseas Transportation Service (NOTS), ATS operated the sometimes sizable fleet of Army transports.

Special regulations for the Army Transport Service were documented by the United States War Office in 1918. They included topics like: general duties of officers, flags and general provisions for movements by sea.

World War II

The USAT Admiral H. T. Mayo served as an Army transport at the end of World War II.

During peacetime ATS was to operate directly under the Quartermaster General through a General superintendent at home ports and in wartime, when formal ports of embarkation were to be established, ATS would come under the port commander's jurisdiction. During the interwar period, ATS Atlantic was based at the New York General Depot, Army Supply Base, in Brooklyn and ATS Pacific and the transport docks were at the San Francisco General Depot, Fort Mason, California. The Army considered maintenance of a nucleus of military personnel, intimately familiar with both military requirements, port and ship operations, that could form the core of a full port of embarkation staff in wartime or other emergency as one of the reasons for maintaining ATS itself. Coordination with other Army transport functions was aided by the fact ATS was one of the four interwar divisions of the Army Transportation Service which also had divisions responsible for rail, motor and animal transport.

ATS itself became absorbed into the Water Division of the United States Transportation Corps and operated the United States Army Transports. However, the Army Transport Service name continued to be applied to the large ship branch of the Water division. The vessels themselves were commanded by civilian merchant mariners with a civilian crew. The large troop transports had military representatives or the Quartermaster or Transportation Corps aboard that were designated as transport commanders, on larger vessels with extended staff, with authority over all embarked personnel but no authority over the ship itself. On smaller vessels or cargo ships a single officer would represent the Corps. The ships were not armed except during wartime when naval type guns were installed. During World War II the guns were manned by Naval Armed Guard gun crews. Naval personnel, either Armed Guard or communications were under their own commander independent of ship's master or Corps representatives in tactical matters.

Six Liberty ships were converted at Point Clear, Alabama into floating aircraft repair depots, operated by the ATS, starting in April 1944, to provide mobile depot support for B-29 Superfortress and P-51 Mustangs based on Guam, Iwo Jima, and Okinawa beginning in December 1944. They were also fitted with landing platforms to accommodate four R-4 helicopters, creating the first seagoing helicopter-equipped ships, and provided medical evacuation of combat casualties in both the Philippines and Okinawa.

After World War II the Army's large transports resumed peacetime operation for a brief time until Cold War between the United States and the Soviet Union. On June 28, 1950, President Harry S. Truman established the Transportation Corps as a permanent branch of the Army.

See also
Transportation Corps
List of ships of the United States Army

References

Bibliography

External links
 With the Army at Hoboken (World War I description of operations at New York.)
 Army Quartermaster Corps—Army Transport Service (A.T.S.)
 Army - Transportation Service (U.S.) (Flags)

Transportation units and formations of the United States Army
 
Ships of the United States Army